The Tartarus Gate is a Big Finish Productions audio drama featuring Lisa Bowerman as Bernice Summerfield, a character from the spin-off media based on the long-running British science fiction television series Doctor Who.

Plot 
Bernice has been removed from time and space and even though the Collection has problems of its own, Jason is doing his best to find her. He receives information that she is on the planet Cerebus Iera, a world that is said to be linked to the gateway to Hell.

Cast
Bernice Summerfield - Lisa Bowerman
Jason Kane - Stephen Fewell
Joseph - Steven Wickham
CroSSScape - Neville Watchurst
La'Heyne - Julia Righton
N1/cian 137 - Crispin Shingler

External links
Big Finish Productions - Professor Bernice Summerfield: The Tartarus Gate 

Bernice Summerfield audio plays
Fiction set in the 27th century